Providence Presbyterian Church and Cemetery  is a historic Presbyterian church and cemetery located at 10140 Providence Road in Matthews, Mecklenburg County, North Carolina. The church was built in 1858, and is a rectangular, gable-front Greek Revival style frame building. It is three bays wide and four bays deep on a low stone foundation and features extraordinarily tall window openings on all four sides. Adjacent to the church is the contributing church cemetery, with the oldest grave marker dated 1764.  Providence Presbyterian Church, the oldest intact and only antebellum frame church in Mecklenburg County.

It was added to the National Register of Historic Places in 1982.

Providence Presbyterian Church came to life from the influx of Ulster Scots to the American ‘promised land’ in the 1700s, a group of people shaped by faith and the idea of a new frontier. They migrated south, took part in the Revolutionary and Civil Wars and established deep roots in Mecklenburg County. It’s no surprise that Providence Road – one of Charlotte’s main thoroughfares – takes its name from our church while other roads, such as Rea Road and McKee Road, are named for members of the PPC congregation over the past 250+ years.

‘Providence’ expresses the founders’ firm trust in the faithfulness of God to work all things for God’s purpose, which is a bedrock tenant of their Presbyterian faith. One of the original seven colonial Presbyterian churches in the county, PPC served as the center of the Providence Community. Though that community has grown exponentially over the years as Charlotte has become more and more populated, the same could also be said of the church today: it still sits at the center of many of the community member’s lives.

Starting with their first minister Rev. William Richardson 1767, to today’s Senior Pastor Walt McCanless, Providence Presbyterian Church has had its fair share of servant leaders. Many worked to grow our congregation from one generation to the next— through times of want and times of wealth. Among those were enslaved communicants who, though denied full membership in the church, contributed much to it during the time prior to the Emancipation Proclamation. They were instrumental in building the “new” sanctuary of 1858.  This is the historic building where they continue to meet for worship today.

They welcome members and visitors alike to share in worship and connect to God’s people and purpose. A wonderful side benefit of visiting them is the opportunity to stroll a property rich in history. The Providence first ‘pulpit,’ also known as Preaching Rock is at the entrance to the cemetery, where markers pre date the Revolutionary War.  As one continues through the back gate, folks can visit the historic enslaved cemetery, a sad reminder of a dark period of our history. This path leads to the nearby spring that first drew worshipers to this spot and provided water for baptisms, as well as drinking water for people and their horses.  

History is too valuable a teacher to be forgotten. Providence Presbyterian Church seeks to learn and grow from the lived faith of Providence’s fathers and mothers. And where their lived experiences were less than consistent with the gospel, reflecting instead their cultural milieu, they seek forgiveness and reconciliation.

References

External links
Official website

Presbyterian churches in North Carolina
Cemeteries in North Carolina
Protestant Reformed cemeteries
Churches on the National Register of Historic Places in North Carolina
Churches completed in 1858
19th-century Presbyterian church buildings in the United States
Churches in Mecklenburg County, North Carolina
National Register of Historic Places in Mecklenburg County, North Carolina